Salvatore Coco (born 22 April 1975) is an Australian film and television actor of Italian descent.

Biography
Coco was born in Sydney and is of Sicilian (from Italy) descent. He performed with the Australian Theatre for Young People, where he developed his talents in acting, singing, guitar, dance and cabaret. He is also a qualified chef.

Career
Coco began his acting career with guest roles in television series such as G.P. and the mini-series Brides of Christ. He is best known for his role as Con Bordino in the television series Heartbreak High. After two years in that role, Coco joined the cast of the final series of Police Rescue as Joseph Cardillo. He had many guest roles in television series such as Country Practice, Water Rats, Wildside, Stingers, Love My Way, East West 101, All Saints and Farscape. His feature film credits include a lead role in Walk the Talk and roles in Looking for Alibrandi, Bootmen and Two Hands. On television, he  played Harry Hammoud, Kings Cross standover man and friend of John Ibrahim in the third instalment of the Underbelly series, The Golden Mile, in 2010. He also played Frank Calabrisi in the four-part drama The Principal in 2015, Bruno Rossi in The Secret Daughter in 2016, and was seen in Brock that same year. Salvatore will return to Home and Away in 2022 as Dimitri, he was previous in the role is a recurring capacity between 2003–2005.

References

External links

1975 births
Australian male film actors
Australian male soap opera actors
Living people
Australian people of Sicilian descent
Male actors from Sydney